Colpach-Haut is a village in the commune of Ell, in western Luxembourg.  , the village has a population of 144.

Redange (canton)
Villages in Luxembourg